Protogynanisa probsti is a species of moth in the family Saturniidae. It was described by Thierry Bouyer in 2001. It is found in Tanzania and Kenya.

References

Moths described in 2001
Saturniinae
Insects of Tanzania
Moths of Africa